Tim Coppens is a Belgian fashion designer who currently lives and works in New York City. He is an ANDAM and LVMH Prize finalist, as well as three time CFDA nominee, and winner of the 2014 CFDA/Swarovski Award for Best Emerging Menswear Designer.

Career 
Born and raised in Belgium, Tim Coppens graduated from the internationally acclaimed Royal Academy of Fine Arts in Antwerp in 1998.
Apart from his services to various luxury and athletic brands as Adidas and Ralph Lauren, Coppens founded his own namesake fashion label in 2011 which is sold globally. Barneys New York immediately ordered his first collection and international retailers suit, including Isetan (Japan), Lane Crawford (Hong Kong), Matches (London), Mr Porter (Online) and Dover Street Market (London).

His collections blend the highest degree of craftsmanship and tailoring with athletic inspired innovation.
 
Tim Coppens has been strongly praised by press. WWD selected him as part of the "Ten of Tomorrow Rising Stars" and "One of the 40 under 40 Designers disrupting Fashion and Retail", while The Business of Fashion named him "1 of the 6 Emerging Fashion Brands Worth Investing In".

Coppens has also gained consistent recognition from the industry including Ecco Domani Award for "Best New Menswear Designer" (2012), Fashion Group International "Rising Star of the Year" Award (2013), CFDA Swarovski Award for "Emerging Menswear Designer of the Year" (2014). LVMH Prize Finalist (2014), ANDAM Finalist (2016) and CFDA "Menswear Designer of the Year" Nominee (2016/2017).

Since the brand's inception, Tim Coppens has been on the forefront of redefining Menswear   and most recently was invited to present his Fall 2017 Collection as guest designer at the prestigious Pitti Uomo in Florence, Italy.

Awards 

 Ecco Domani Award for "Best New Menswear Designer" (2012)
 Fashion Group International "Rising Star of the Year" Award (2013)
 CFDA Swarovski Award for "Emerging Menswear Designer of the Year" (2014)
 LVMH Prize Finalist (2014)
 ANDAM Finalist (2016) . 
 CFDA "Menswear Designer of the Year" Nominee (2016/2017).

References

External links
 

Year of birth missing (living people)
Living people
Royal Academy of Fine Arts (Antwerp) alumni
Belgian fashion designers